Sandy Praeger (born October 21, 1944) is a former politician from the U.S. state of Kansas who served as the Kansas Insurance Commissioner from 2003 to 2015. Prior to her term as insurance commissioner, she was a member of the Kansas Senate and Kansas House of Representatives, and served as mayor of Lawrence, Kansas. Although she won her elections as a Republican, she disagreed with the more conservative faction in her party, eventually leading her to endorse a Democrat to succeed her as insurance commissioner.

Political career

Early career
Praeger was a member of the city commission in her hometown of Lawrence, Kansas from 1985 to 1989, including a stint as mayor from 1986 to 1987. She served one term in the Kansas House of Representatives, elected in 1990; in 1992, she won the first of her three terms in the Kansas State Senate, representing the 2nd District. Praeger served in the State Senate from 1993 to 2002, when she was elected as insurance commissioner; Mark Buhler was elected to finish out the remaining two years of her term as State Senator.

Insurance Commissioner
Praeger was elected Insurance Commissioner on November 2, 2002, and her term began January 13, 2003. She was re-elected in 2006 and 2010 to the same position. As commissioner, she was responsible for regulating all insurance sold in Kansas and overseeing the nearly 1,700 insurance companies and 110,000 agents licensed to do business in the state.

Praeger is also the former president of the National Association of Insurance Commissioners, and has been their spokesperson in favor of maintaining state insurance regulation rather than an optional federal charter.

During her term in office, she supported the Patient Protection and Affordable Care Act and opposed conservative Republican Governor Sam Brownback's plan to join a nine-state healthcare compact.

Praeger chose not to seek re-election in 2014. Instead, she chose to endorse the Democratic candidate, Dennis Anderson, to succeed her as Insurance Commissioner.

Praeger is a graduate of the University of Kansas.

Organizations 
 Speaker, American Academy of Pediatrics
 Speaker, American Association of Health Plans
 Founding Member, Court Appointed Special Advocates
 Speaker, Forum for State Health Policy Leadership
 Founding Member, Haskell Indian Nations University Foundation
 Founding Member, Health Care Access
 Speaker, National Association of Chain Drug Stores
 Speaker, National Association of Health Data Organizations
 President-Elect/Secretary/Treasurer, National Association of Insurance Commissioners
 Former Vice-Chair, National Association of Insurance Commissioners Midwestern Zone
 Speaker, National Conference of State Legislatures
 Board of Directors, United Way of Douglas County
 Speaker, Women in Government.

References

External links 
 
 Interview with Praeger at the Kansas Oral History Project

Republican Party Kansas state senators
Living people
Mayors of places in Kansas
Republican Party members of the Kansas House of Representatives
Kansas Insurance Commissioners
University of Kansas alumni
Women mayors of places in Kansas
Women state legislators in Kansas
Politicians from Lawrence, Kansas
Politicians from Fayetteville, North Carolina
Women state constitutional officers of Kansas
1944 births
20th-century American women politicians
20th-century American politicians
21st-century American women politicians
21st-century American politicians